is a former Japanese football player.

Club career
Ideguchi was born in Toshima, Tokyo on May 14, 1979. After graduating from high school, he joined the Yokohama Marinos (later Yokohama F. Marinos) in 1998. Although he played for the club until 2002, he did not play as much as Japan national team defenders Masami Ihara, Norio Omura, and Naoki Matsuda. He also played for Consadole Sapporo (1999), Shonan Bellmare (2001), and Sanfrecce Hiroshima (2002). In 2003, he moved to Sagan Tosu. He played many matches at Sagan. He moved to Tokushima Vortis in 2006. He retired at the end of the 2006 season.

National team career
In August 1995, Ideguchi was selected Japan U-17 national team for 1995 U-17 World Championship, but he did not play in the match.

Club statistics

References

External links

biglobe.ne.jp

1979 births
Living people
Association football people from Tokyo
Japanese footballers
J1 League players
J2 League players
Yokohama F. Marinos players
Hokkaido Consadole Sapporo players
Shonan Bellmare players
Sanfrecce Hiroshima players
Sagan Tosu players
Tokushima Vortis players
Association football defenders